In quantum information theory and operator theory, the Choi–Jamiołkowski isomorphism refers to the correspondence between quantum channels (described by completely positive maps) and quantum states (described by density matrices), this is introduced by Man-Duen Choi and Andrzej Jamiołkowski. It is also called channel-state duality by some authors in the quantum information area, but mathematically, this is a more general correspondence between positive operators and the complete positive superoperators.

Definition 
Consider the maximally entangled state    
 
 

Since  is completely positive,  is a nonnegative operator. This kind of correspondence is called Choi-Jamiołkowski isomorphism.

References 

Quantum information theory